The Caledonian Railway 179 Class and 184 Class were 4-6-0 mixed-traffic locomotives designed by John F. McIntosh and built in two batches in 1913-14 and 1914-15 respectively, at the Caledonian Railway's own St. Rollox Works.  The differences between the two batches were minor, and they are often considered to be a single class.

Overview
They were the last new locomotives designed by McIntosh before his retirement.  The type was essentially a superheated version of the earlier 908 Class and were built primarily for use on express goods trains, although they also worked on passenger traffic and were painted in the Caledonian's blue passenger livery.  The locomotives were the most successful of McIntosh's various 4-6-0 designs.

LMS ownership
The locomotives passed into the ownership of the London, Midland and Scottish Railway upon its formation in 1923.  Although the older 908 Class were treated as passenger locomotives by the LMS, the 179s were classified as a freight type and were repainted into unlined black freight livery.  They continued in use until they were displaced by new LMS standard locomotives such as the Black Five 4-6-0s.

Disposal
Although they outlasted most of the other McIntosh 4-6-0s they were withdrawn and scrapped between 1934 and 1946.

Numbering and Locomotive Histories

source: BritishSteam

See also 
 Locomotives of the Caledonian Railway

References 

179 and 184 Classes
4-6-0 locomotives
Railway locomotives introduced in 1913